Dziwiszów  is a village in the administrative district of Gmina Jeżów Sudecki, within Jelenia Góra County, Lower Silesian Voivodeship, in south-western Poland.

The village has a population of 1,000.

Notable residents
Iris von Arnim

References

Villages in Karkonosze County